Zavkuh Rural District is a rural district (dehestan) in Pishkamar District, Kalaleh County, Golestan Province, Iran. At the 2006 census, its population was 23,610, in 4,863 families.  The rural district has 41 villages.

References 

Rural Districts of Golestan Province
Kalaleh County